This is a list of rural localities in Magadan Oblast. Magadan Oblast is a federal subject (an oblast) of Russia. It is geographically located in the Far East region of the country, and is administratively part of the Far Eastern Federal District. Magadan Oblast has a population of 156,996 (2010 Census), making it the least populated oblast and the third-least populated federal subject in Russia.

Olsky District 
Rural localities in Olsky District:

 Yamsk

Severo-Evensky District 
Rural localities in Severo-Evensky District:

 Gizhiga

Srednekansky District 
Rural localities in Srednekansky District:

 Ust-Srednekan

See also 
 
 Lists of rural localities in Russia

References 

Magadan Oblast